Peabody Place is a mixed use residential, retail, and office redevelopment project located in Downtown Memphis, Tennessee that covers eight city blocks.

Development
The development was planned for years, and the first building was to appear in 1993.

Enclosed Mall 

While it was initially successful, the excitement quickly fizzled out and the enclosed mall proved to be unable to compete with more convenient suburban alternatives in more affluent neighborhoods that were perceived as safer, due to their demographics. Tourists visiting Downtown were also not particularly interested in visiting a mall that had stores similar to those available in their hometowns, so that clientele did not materialize either.

Over several years, most of the stores in the indoor mall were closed. A few were replaced by new establishments, such as Encore restaurant, and Primetime Sports Bar, but those were also unable to gain traction and eventually closed also. While the rest of Peabody Place and the Downtown area in general had been performing well, the enclosed mall failed. Many considered the fundamental concept of an enclosed mall to be somewhat antiquated by the turn of the 21st century and particularly inappropriate in dense urban areas, criticizing developer Belz Enterprises, a company historically specializing in suburban properties, for its seeming lack of urban expertise.

In late 2005 the Encore Restaurant and Bar opened at 150 Peabody Place. In November 2006 Muvico closed eight of its screens. Afterwards, Ann Taylor Loft moved from Peabody Place to Germantown, Tennessee (closer to its main customer base), Tower Records went into liquidation, and Napoli Pizza and Subs closed. In early 2004 the Isaac Hayes Restaurant closed, and since then the Sports Avenue store sales figures had significantly decreased. The Jillian's had higher sales in 2007 than in 2006, and Owen Reed, the assistant general manager, said that business was robust especially while games occurred at the FedEx Forum and while concerts took place in Downtown Memphis. Reed said "We dictate the volume at this mall. With the exception of the movie theater, we define foot traffic."

By January 2008, the second floor of the retail area was almost entirely vacant, and Sydnie's Gifts and Walson's Jewelers announced that it was closing. The Muvico theater was scheduled to shut down by the end of March 2008. Belz considered converting the Muvico space into a hotel lobby, a meeting space, and 160-170 hotel rooms. In June 2008 the Dan McGuinness Irish pub in the Peabody Place Retail & Entertainment Center announced it was moving to Olive Branch, Mississippi, a nearby suburb. In July 2008, Belz announced plans to convert the former Muvico theater into hotel suites. It was not an expansion of The Peabody Hotel, but instead a separate hotel property. The idea was put on hold by the late-2000s recession. River City Management opened the Primetime Sports Bar in early 2009. It took over the spot previously held by Jillian's. Earlier in 2009, Starbucks in Peabody Place closed. In September 2009 the Encore Restaurant closed. In August 2010 the Primetime Sports Bar closed.

In February 2012, the mall officially closed to the public, while the untouched interior of the vacant mall was still visible from the street until June 2016.

In June 2016, ServiceMaster announced a relocation of its global headquarters to the former mall space, marking an end to years of vacancy.

Notable sights 
Peabody Place covers a dense variety of spaces, ranging from the restored historic Peabody Hotel to the Center for Southern Folklore to the nationally recognized and modern street-level offices of the Red Deluxe Brand Development advertising agency. The area encompasses some two million square feet and is connected by skywalks, corridors and trolley stations.

Tourist attractions nearby include Beale Street, FedExForum, the Orpheum Theatre and AutoZone Park. The project's new and restored historic buildings include a 15-story modern office tower, two apartment projects, two museums, and numerous restaurants.

In 2007, the USA Today included in its list of "message[s] from the rooftops" (intentional messages to be seen on Google Earth) a message on the roof of Peabody Place that invites: "come downtown and play.™". No further information was given, but the message can still be observed as of 2015 at coordinates 35.1411673,-90.052704.

References

Further reading
 Yawn, David. "Peabody Place driving Downtown Revival." Memphis Business Journal. August 7–11, 1995.

External links

 Peabody Place - Belz Enterprises
 Tower at Peabody Place - CBRE Group
 50 Peabody Place - CBRE Group

Buildings and structures in Memphis, Tennessee